In the legal terminology of property law, common intention is where there is an express or implied agreement between unmarried cohabitees as to their beneficial entitlements in the family home.

The common intention constructive trust has been used by English courts to divide assets upon separation.

English property law
English legal terminology
Marriage, unions and partnerships in England
English family law